The following is an episode list for the American television series Cagney & Lacey. A total of 125 episodes were produced, as well as five television movies (the 1981 pilot and four reunion movies from 1994 to 1996).

Series overview

Episodes

Pilot (1981)
 Loretta Swit played Det. Christine Cagney (TV movie pilot only)

Season 1 (1982)
 Meg Foster played Det. Christine Cagney (season 1 only)

Season 2 (1982–83)
Sharon Gless played Det. (later Sgt.) Christine Cagney (seasons 2–7 and post-series TV movies)

Season 3 (1984)

Season 4 (1984–85)

Season 5 (1985–86)

Season 6 (1986–87)

Season 7 (1987–88)

TV movies (1994–96)

External links

References

Lists of American crime drama television series episodes